Gap junction beta-3 protein (GJB3), also known as connexin 31 (Cx31) — is a protein that in humans is encoded by the GJB3 gene.

Function 

This gene is a member of the connexin gene family. The encoded protein is a component of gap junctions, which are composed of arrays of intercellular channels that provide a route for the diffusion of low molecular weight materials from cell to cell. Mutations in this gene can cause non-syndromic deafness or erythrokeratodermia variabilis, a skin disorder. Alternative splicing results in multiple transcript variants encoding the same protein.

References

Further reading

External links
  GeneReviews/NCBI/NIH/UW entry on Deafness and Hereditary Hearing Loss Overview

Connexins